Patryk Wykrota (born 13 November 2000) is a Polish sprinter. He won a bronze medal in the 4×100 m relay at the 2022 European Athletics Championships, setting a Polish national record of 38.15 seconds in the process.

References

External links
 

2000 births
Living people
Polish male sprinters
European Athletics Championships medalists